Arhaphe cicindeloides is a species of bordered plant bug in the family Largidae. It is found in Central America but all records of this species from the United States are misidentifications of the related Arhaphe arguta.

References

External links

 

Largidae
Articles created by Qbugbot
Insects described in 1873